Rawal (also spelled Raval) or Raol originally is a regional variation of the Hindi princely ruler title Raja/Radjah (literally "king") used in some princely states in Rajputana and Western India (notably Gujarat), and is now also used as a caste designation or surname by several communities in Southern Asia. A village near Sumer has people filled with surname- Rawal of General Category.

Princely titles 
Notable (but non-salute) states using this title for their ruling prince were, both under the colonial Mahi Kantha Agency (in the third -high- of seven classes of states) and in present Gujarat, India :
 the Raol of Malpur
 the Raol of Mansa

Maharawal 
This 'Western' equivalent of the higher (gradually deflated) Hindi title Maharaja (literally 'great king') was notably used by three salute states in Rajputana (presently in Rajasthan), all entitled to a (high-ranking) Hereditary gun salute of 15-guns :
 the Maharawal (also called Maharaja) of Jaisalmer
 the Maharawal of Banswara
 the Maharawal of Dungarpur
 
and one in Gujarat, entitled to a (rather low-ranking) Hereditary salute of 9-guns (11-guns personal) :
 the Maharaol (or Maharawal) of Bari(y)a

Surnames 
As a surname, "Rawal" is found among multiple communities in India.

 Raval/Rawal surname also found in Brahmin community in Gujarat, for example Paresh Rawal.
 Rajputs for example Bappa Rawal.
 In Haryana, Rawal surname found in Gurjar community/caste.
 Marathas
 The Nambudiri priests of the Badrinath and Kedarnath were given the title of "Rawal" by the king of Garhwal in 1776
 Raval (also known as Rawal or Raval Yogi), an Indian caste categorized among the Other Backward Classes
 Rawal, a  caste found in Pakistan and Pakistani diaspora; its members claim to be the original rulers of Rawalpindi

People 
People with the title or surname Rawal include (in alphabetical order):

 Bappa Rawal(Rajput), legendary ruler of Mewar kingdom India
 Bhim Bahadur Rawal, Nepali politician
 Jam Rawal, ruler of Kachchh princely state in India
 Narendra Raval, Kenyan entrepreneur and philanthropist
 Jayakumar Jitendrasinh Rawal, Indian politician
 Jitendra Jatashankar Rawal, Indian astrophysicist
 Kalpana Rawal, Kenyan lawyer and judge
 Lal Bahadur Rawal, Nepali politician
 Nisha Rawal, Indian model-actress
 Paresh Rawal, Indian actor
 Rajendra Rawal, Nepali footballer
 Darshan Raval, Indian singer
 Rawal Jaisal, ruler of Jaisalmer state in India
 Rawal Mallinath, folk hero of Rajasthan, India
 Rawal Ratan Singh, ruler of Mewar state in India
 Sanjay Rawal, American documentary film director
 Sashi Rawal, Nepali pop singersinger
 Vaibhav Rawal, Indian cricketer
 Vipul K Rawal, Indian scriptwriter

Clan 
 Rawal, A Clan Of Lord Shiva Followers.

Places 
 Rawal lake, a reservoir in Pakistan
 Rawal Express, a Pakistani train service between Lahore and Rawalpindi
 Rawal, Uttar Pradesh

References 

Heads of state
Noble titles
Royal titles
Titles in India
Titles in Pakistan
Indian court titles
History of Pakistan
Titles of national or ethnic leadership
Filipino royalty
Hindi words and phrases
Shaikh clans
Social groups of Punjab, Pakistan
Social groups of India